A trilobite is a type of extinct marine arthropod.

Trilobite or Trilobites  also may refer to:

 Trilobites (genus), an obsolete genus of the arthropods
 Trilobite: Witness to Evolution (2001), book by Richard Fortey

 Electrolux Trilobite, robot vacuum cleaner
 Trilobyte (company), computer game developer
 The Trilobites, Australian rock band

See also
Trilobite beetle (Platerodrilus), an insect
Trilobite larva, a juvenile stage in certain invertebrates